Nora Orlandi (born 28 June 1933; pseudonym: Joan Christian) is an Italian pianist, violinist, soprano vocalist, composer and occasional actress. As the first female film composer of Italian cinema, she composed scores for Spaghetti Westerns, Eurospy films and gialli throughout the 1960s and is best known for "Dies Irae", a short piece she wrote and performed for Sergio Martino's The Strange Vice of Mrs Wardh (1971) which was later reused in Quentin Tarantino's Kill Bill: Volume 2 (2004). Her younger sister is the singer-songwriter Paola Orlandi.

Select filmography 
 Johnny Yuma (1966)
 Clint the Stranger (1967)
 Ten Thousand Dollars for a Massacre (1967)
 Death at Owell Rock (1967)
 The Sweet Body of Deborah (1968)
 $100,000 for a Killing (1968)
 Double Face (1969)
 The Strange Vice of Mrs Wardh (1971)

References

External links

1933 births
Italian film score composers
Women film score composers
Spaghetti Western composers
Easy listening musicians
Living people
Italian women singers